Paralus and Xanthippus (Gr.  and ) were the two legitimate sons of Pericles, Xanthippus being the older one and Paralus the younger, and hence members of the Alcmaeonid family. Xanthippus was named after Pericles' father, while Paralus was named after the sacred trireme and flagship of the Athenian fleet.

They were educated by their father with the greatest care, but they both appear to have been of inferior capacity, which was uncompensated by their poor worth of character, although contemporary and some later writers seemed to consider Paralus to have been a somewhat more hopeful youth with more potential than his brother. Both of them had the nickname of Blitomammas (literally "cabbage sucker", an epithet for a slow or dim-witted person).  Both Xanthippus and Paralus, along with their mother, fell victims to the plague in 429 BC.  Pericles himself succumbed shortly thereafter.

References

429 BC deaths
5th-century BC Athenians
5th-century BC births
Alcmaeonidae
Ancient Greeks who died from disease